Edde or EDDE can refer to:

 Edde, Hungary, a village in Somogy county, Hungary
 Edde, Lebanon, a village located 45 km north of Beirut, Lebanon
 The ICAO airport code for Erfurt–Weimar Airport in Erfurt, Germany

See also
 Edde (surname)